Stumpffia kibomena is a species of frog in the family Microhylidae. It is endemic to the Andasibe region of eastern Madagascar. The species is diurnal, and found in primary, secondary, and eucalyptus forests. It has not yet been assessed by the IUCN Red List.

References

Stumpffia
Amphibians described in 2015
Endemic frogs of Madagascar